The Sheekhaal (var. Sheikhaal, also known as Fiqi Omar, is a Somali clan. They inhabit Somalia, Ethiopia, Djibouti and with considerable numbers also found in the Northern Frontier District (NFD) in Kenya.

Overview
Sheekhal traces its ancestry to Sheikh Abadir Umar Ar-Rida, also known as Fiqi Umar, who in turn traced his lineage to the first caliph, Abu Bakr (Sayid Abubakar Al-Sadiq). According to the explorer Richard F. Burton, In his book First Footsteps in East Africa. The Sheekhaash or Sheekhaal is described as the only Somalis of the maintains not derived from Dir and Darood.  They claim descent from "Caliph Abu Bakr"  and asserted that their ancestor Khutab bin Fakih Umar crossed over from Al-Hijaz. Fiqi Umar crossed over from the Arabian Peninsula to the Horn of Africa with his six sons: Umar the Greater, Umar the Lesser, the two Abdillahs, Ahmad and Siddik.  Sheikh Ar-Rida is also regarded as the saint of Harar. The lineage  goes back to Banu Taym, through the first Caliph Abu Bakr.

Some clans of Sheekhaal would argue that while they are politically aligned with the larger Hawiye clan, this does not mean that they are Hawiye  This view is shared by the Aw-Qutub, one of the major Sheekhal subclans; they too totally reject the notion that the Sheekhal are part of hawiye : Lobogay (Loboge), Aw Qudub and Gendershe and Ali.  Lewis (1982) mentions that the largest clan of the Sheikhal is the Reer Fiqi Omar, whose most important lineage, the Reer Aw Qutub, inhabit Somali region of Ethiopia. The Sheekhal clans were reportedly considered as part of the Hawiye politically until after the civil war.

General Mohamed Ibrahim Liiqliqato, who was a Sheikhal, described in his book how the Sheikhal became associated with the Hawiye and added as ‘Martileh Hiraab’ (literally meaning guests of Hiraab). Shekhal are also mentioned to be one of the religious groups of Somalia along with the Ashraf.

Sheekhaal sub-clans
 Cusmaan Fiqi Cumar (Gendershe)
 Aw-Qutub
 Aw Axmed Loobage
 Sheekhaal Jazeera
Reer Aw Sacid (Ali Fiqi cumar)

Faqi Ayuub Fiqi Omar Gursum in Ethiopia and Eastern Hararghe
 Qallu
 Teedan
 Abiib
 Cali Cafiif
 Gudle
 Cabdisamad (found in Banadir Shangani)
 Sheikh Hayti
 Seyle

Prominent figures

 Abdulrahman Kinana, first Speaker of the East African Legislative Assembly, 2001–2006; former Deputy Minister of Foreign Affairs and Minister of Defence of Tanzania.
Mohamed Ibrahim Liqliiqato, Prominent Somali politician, diplomat, and Major General from Kismayo lower Jubba region. He was a Somali ambassador to the Soviet Union, and ambassador to West-Germany in 1970s. He also held the ministry of Agriculture and Interior ministry. He is the longest-serving speaker of the parliament, holding the position from 1982 to 1991. The Liiqliiqato bridge in Beledwen named after him.
Mohammed Hussein Ali, former commissioner of the Kenya Police.
Dahir Adan Elmi, chief of Somali Armed Forces, major general and the commander of Qabdir-Daharre Battalion in Somalia-Ethiopian War in 1977 who won bravery golden award that war. He is regarded as the most decorated general in Somali army.

References

Works cited
 http://www.geeskaafrika.com/20606/somalia-the-first-governor-of-hiiraan-1960/
 

Somali clans
Somali clans in Ethiopia